Dulee Johnson (born 7 November 1984) is a Liberian former professional footballer who played as a midfielder and striker. He is best remembered for his time with AIK with which he won the 2009 Allsvenskan and 2009 Svenska Cupen. A full international between 2001 and 2016, he won 35 caps for the Liberia national team and played at the 2002 African Cup of Nations.

Club career

Floda BoIF
Born in Monrovia, Dulee Johnson is one of several Liberian footballers who were brought to Sweden by Floda BoIF manager Stig Johansson in the late 1990s, after having been discovered at Gothia Cup. The Liberian players, which included Dioh Williams and Jimmy Dixon, moved into manager Johanssons villa where they lived while they played for the Swedish lower league club.

BK Häcken
After a few successful seasons, all the three previously mentioned players were signed by Allsvenskan club BK Häcken. Johnson quickly found success on the pitch for his new club. He was a starter for the full four and a half years with Häcken.

AIK and Maccabi
In 2006, Johnson was signed by AIK, where he became an instant success as the replacement in midfield for Derek Boateng.

In July 2008, Johnson signed a 3-year contract with Maccabi Tel Aviv. He only spent one season with the Israeli side, scoring one goal and making two assists. Johnson also helped them win the League Cup, also known as the Toto Cup. He left the club in June 2009, and signed a new deal with his previous club AIK.

Panetolikos
On 21 January 2011, it was announced that Dulee Johnson had signed an 18-month contract with Greek club Panetolikos.

De Graafschap
In May 2011, Johnson was on trial with Dutch club De Graafschap and was offered a contract. He played three Eredivisie matches and one KNVB Cup match in which he scored his only goal for De Graafschap. Due to his increased market value, the Liberian midfielder received an attractive offer from one of South Africa's big clubs and he made the move to play in the South African premiership.

AmaZulu
On 16 July 2012, Johnson signed a two-year contract with South African club AmaZulu. Johnson's quickly made his name in the league from the preseason matches and throughout his term in the league.

IK Brage
On 28 December 2012, Johnson signed a two-year contract with Swedish Superettan club IK Brage. In January 2014 he left the club for higher level after they got relegated to Division 1. On a free transfer Dulee moved to Romanian side Săgeata Năvodari.

Moss
On 2 September 2015, Johnson signed for Norwegian 2. divisjon side Moss FK.

Molde
At the end of the 2015 season, Johnson was reported to be training with Molde FK.

On 9 January 2016, Johnson signed a one-year contract with Tippeligaen side Molde FK., but played only one match, a first round cup match against Kristiansund, before being released from his contract 1 June 2016.

Lyn Toppfotball
On 1 June 2018, Johnson signed with 3. divisjon side Lyn Toppfotball for the remainder of the season.

International career
In March 2010, he was granted Swedish citizenship, and is now regarded as an EU player. AIK's Liberian International Dulee Johnson Granted EU Citizenship. Dulee Johnson is one of Liberia's best creative midfielders, he played in the 2002 African Cup and Nations, and he was recently recalled to the Liberian national team to help them secure a slot for the 2017 African Cup of Nations. He will travel down to Liberia in June 2016 to play against Togo in one of Liberia's toughest football.

Personal life 
He is the son of former Liberia international player and manager Josiah Johnson.

Career statistics

Honours
Maccabi Tel Aviv
 Toto Cup (1): 2008–09
AIK
 Allsvenskan (1): 2009
 Svenska Cupen (1): 2009
 Supercupen (1): 2010

References

 http://www.libstars.com/molde-fk-signs-dulee-johnson/
 FIFA.com Dulee Johnson profile - Fifa.com

External links
 FIFA.com

1984 births
Living people
Liberian expatriate footballers
Liberia international footballers
Sportspeople from Monrovia
Liberian footballers
Association football midfielders
Floda BoIF players
BK Häcken players
AIK Fotboll players
Maccabi Tel Aviv F.C. players
Panetolikos F.C. players
De Graafschap players
AmaZulu F.C. players
AFC Săgeata Năvodari players
FC Politehnica Iași (2010) players
Molde FK players
IK Start players
Lyn Fotball players
Israeli Premier League players
Allsvenskan players
Superettan players
Eredivisie players
Liga I players
Eliteserien players
Norwegian Second Division players
Norwegian Third Division players
Football League (Greece) players
Expatriate footballers in Israel
Expatriate footballers in Greece
Expatriate footballers in Norway
Expatriate soccer players in South Africa
Expatriate footballers in the Netherlands
Expatriate footballers in Romania
2002 African Cup of Nations players
Naturalized citizens of Sweden
Swedish people of Liberian descent
Sportspeople of Liberian descent
Liberian expatriate sportspeople in Israel
Liberian expatriate sportspeople in Greece
Liberian expatriate sportspeople in Norway
Liberian expatriate sportspeople in South Africa
Liberian expatriate sportspeople in the Netherlands
Liberian expatriate sportspeople in Romania